Chakkarayumma is a 1984 Indian Malayalam film, directed by Sajan and produced by Jagan Appachan. The film stars Madhu, Srividya, Mammootty and Jagathy Sreekumar in the lead roles. The film has musical score by Shyam. The film was remade in Tamil as Bandham with Sivaji Ganesan and in Telugu as Bandham starring Shoban Babu. Both versions had Shalini reprising her role.

Cast
Mammootty as Babu
Lalu Alex as Babunni
Jagathy Sreekumar as Rehman
Madhu as Mathews
Srividya  as Beegam
Baby Shalini
Kajal Kiran as Vineetha Mathews
M. G. Soman as Sayed Muhammed
Sabitha Anand as Asha Thomas
Cochin Haneefa
Raveendran

Soundtrack
The music was composed by Shyam and the lyrics were written by Poovachal Khader.

References

External links
 

1984 films
1980s Malayalam-language films
Malayalam films remade in other languages
Films directed by Sajan